is a Japanese tarento who is a former member of the idol groups AKB48 and JKT48. She auditioned for AKB48's sixth generation and was promoted to member of Team A. Her talent agency is Is.Field (she was previously affiliated with Watanabe Productions) and was one of the charter members to support JKT48. She is also a former member of the sub-unit French Kiss.

Career 

Takajo auditioned for AKB48 and was chosen in the group's sixth generation, also known as the third generation of Kenkyusei (trainees). She debuted on August 23, 2008, in the concert "Live DVD wa Derudarou kedo, Yappari Nama ni Kagiruze". On October 19, she substituted for Haruna Kojima on the Team A Fifth Stage, "Renai Kinshi Jorei". On December 29, Takajo was promoted to AKB48's Team A; she only spent 71 days from theater debut to full member, and it was the fastest promotion in AKB48 history at the time, until Rion Azuma from SKE48 was promoted in 2013. 

Takajo's first A-side with AKB48 was in 2010 for the single "Ponytail to Shushu". In the 2010 AKB48 general elections, she placed 13th and landed a spot on the title track for "Heavy Rotation". She and AKB48 members Yuki Kashiwagi and Asuka Kuramochi formed a sub-unit, "French Kiss" and the group released the single "Zutto Mae Kara" which peaked at number five on the Oricon charts.

On August 24, 2012, the first day of its Tokyo Dome concert series, AKB48 announced a reorganization of its teams. Takajo and Haruka Nakagawa were sent to Jakarta to help AKB48's sister group JKT48. On April 28, 2013, it was announced that she would hold a concurrent position in AKB48 Team B. On February 24, 2014, during the Grand Reformation Festival, it was announced that she was released from her concurrent positions in JKT48. In 2015, she was transferred to AKB48 Team K. On December 15, 2015, at the group's AKB48 Kōhaku Uta Gassen event, she announced that she would be leaving the group. On February 23, 2016, AKB48 gave her a graduation ceremony. She officially graduated from AKB48 on May 1, 2016. She left Watanabe Productions and became a freelancer the next day, May 2.

On November 20, 2017, she announced her affiliation with the film production company and talent agency Is.Field.

Personal life 
On February 28, 2019, Takajo announced her marriage to Filipino-Japanese footballer Yuji Takahashi. She gave birth to a baby boy on November 7, 2019. She gave birth to a second baby boy on September 2, 2022.

Discography

Singles with AKB48

Singles with JKT48

Stage units 
 Team A 5th Stage (Renai Kinshi Jorei)
 Kuroi Tenshi
 Heart Gata Virus (backup for Haruna Kojima)

 Team K 4th Stage (Saishuu Bell ga Naru) (backup for Sae Miyazawa)

 Team K 5th Stage (Sakaagari)
 Ai no Iro (backup for Sae Miyazawa)

 Himawari Gumi 2nd Stage (Yume o Shinaseru wake ni wa Ikanai) in Theater G-Rosso
 Tonari no Banana (Standby for Tomomi Kasai, Reina Fujie, Haruka Nakagawa, Misaki Iwasa)
Hajimete no Jelly Beans (Standby for Sae Miyazawa, Reina Fujie, Haruka Nakagawa, Mariya Suzuki)

 Team A 6th Stage (Mokugekisha)
 Enjo Rosen

 Team J 1st Stage (Renai Kinshi Jourei/Aturan Anti Cinta)
 Renai Kinshi Jourei (Aturan Arti Cinta)

Appearances

Movie
 Majisuka Gakuen (2010)
 Majisuka Gakuen 2 (2011)

Television
AKB0ji59fun (July 28 – August 18, 2008, Nippon Television)
AKBINGO (August 2008 – December 2015, Nippon Television)
Shukan AKB (July 2009 –, TV Tokyo)
Suiensaa (April 28, 5 May, May 12, 2009, January 5, 2010, NHK)
Majisuka Gakuen (January 8 – March 26, 2010, TV Tokyo)
Majisuka Gakuen 2(April 15–29, May 27, June 3, 17, 2011 TV Tokyo)
SAVEPOINT (June 2014 -, TV Tokyo)
Kasane (May 2015, TV Tokyo), Kayoi Tatarami

Radio
 AKB48 Ashita Made Mou Chotto (Nippon Cultural Broadcasting)
 AKB48 All Night Nippon (Nippon Broadcasting System)

Publications

Photobooks
 B.L.T.U-17 Vol.9 Sizzleful Girl 2009 Winter (February 5, 2009, Tokyo News Service) 
 B.L.T.U-17 Vol.11 Sizzleful Girl 2009 Summer (August 5, 2009, Tokyo News Service)

DVDs
 Takajo Aki Akicha to Kaerō (2010)
 Takajo Aki 2nd DVD Wonderland (2011)

References

External links
  at Ameba  

1991 births
Living people
Musicians from Fukuoka Prefecture
Japanese idols
AKB48 members
JKT48 members
Sony Music Entertainment Japan artists
Singers from Tokyo
French Kiss (band)
21st-century Japanese women singers
21st-century Japanese singers
21st-century Japanese actresses